Seccafien is a surname of Italian origin. Notable people with the surname include:

Andrea Seccafien (born 1990), Canadian long-distance runner
Enrique Seccafien (born 1984), Argentine football midfielder 

Surnames of Italian origin